Lakefield is a coastal locality in the Shire of Cook, Queensland, Australia.

Geography 
Lakefield is on the east coast of Cape York Peninsula. Lakefield Road runs through the locality from the south-east to the north-west with connections via the Endeavour Battle Camp Road to Laura and the Peninsula Developmental Road to the south-west and to Cooktown to the south-east.

The Normanby River, North Kennedy River, Hann River, Annie River, and many other creeks and rivers join as they flow to the northern coast of Lakefield to the Coral Sea, creating many lakes.

The Rinyirru National Park is within Lakefield.

History 

Heritage listings 
Lakeland has a number of heritage-listed sites, including:
 Rinyirru National Park: Old Laura Homestead

References

External links 

 
Shire of Cook
Localities in Queensland